Bogert Covered Bridge is a historic wooden covered bridge located at Allentown, Pennsylvania. It has vertical plank siding and a gable roof. It was restored by the Allentown Parks Department.

History
Bogert's Bridge was built between 1841 and 1842. It takes its name from the Bogert family. Peter Bogert purchased the land on which the bridge is located in 1744 as part of his farm. Settlers are said to have put stones in the Little Lehigh at that place and used it as a crossing. In the 1760s, a crude log bridge, later replaced by a wooden plank bridge, was built on the site.

When American Indians complained that this bridge blocked their canoes, Bogert was called on to settle the dispute. The American Indians believed he treated them fairly, afterward calling Bogert "the Peacemaker."

Bogert's Bridge is a Burr truss, named after a design created by Theodore Burr of Connecticut in the early 19th century. Its most distinctive feature is two long arch trusses resting on abutments at either end. It was built by local men. John Waltman of Allentown worked on the bridge as a carpenter's apprentice at the age of sixteen.

The Pennsylvania Department of Highways took responsibility for the bridge from Lehigh County in 1945 because it carried South 24th Street, which linked state routes Hamilton Street and Lehigh Street.

The bridge served its role well for many years into the late 1950s. But at 3:15 a.m. on February 19, 1956, a speeding truck pulling a trailer smashed into the bridge, splintering seven of the bridge's twelve-by-twelve-inch crossbeams. Its roof sagged in the middle. Initially, Lehigh County officials wanted to tear down the bridge, believing it had become a traffic hazard. On May 30, 1957, a second accident involving a truck carrying an earthmover crashed into the bridge, smashing the roof and causing extensive damage.

A letter-writing campaign in 1957 by the Save the Bogert's Bridge Committee obtained state approval to redirect South 24th Street to a new bridge located a few hundred feet away from the structure. The covered bridge was then reconstructed by the Commonwealth and given to Allentown in 1964.

Today, Bogert's is the oldest covered bridge in Lehigh County and among the oldest in the country. It is open to pedestrian and bicycle traffic only. It was listed on the National Register of Historic Places in 1980.

Gallery

See also
 List of historic places in Allentown, Pennsylvania

References

External links

Covered bridges on the National Register of Historic Places in Pennsylvania
Covered bridges in Lehigh County, Pennsylvania
Bridges completed in 1841
Wooden bridges in Pennsylvania
Bridges in Lehigh County, Pennsylvania
Tourist attractions in Allentown, Pennsylvania
History of Allentown, Pennsylvania
Buildings and structures in Allentown, Pennsylvania
National Register of Historic Places in Lehigh County, Pennsylvania
Road bridges on the National Register of Historic Places in Pennsylvania
Burr Truss bridges in the United States